Mesa Public Library is the Los Alamos branch of the Los Alamos County Library System in New Mexico, United States. The library collection has more than 160,000 items which include books, CDs, DVDs, original paintings, and material in several foreign languages. The Southwest Collection contains over 3,400 fiction and nonfiction books about New Mexico and Arizona.

History 
The library started in 1943 as a subscription library, after the donation of $5 by 70 families living in Los Alamos. In 1945 it became free and open to all. In 1985 a branch library opened in White Rock. In 1994 the Los Alamos branch moved into its current building designed by architect Antoine Predock and located west of Fuller Lodge. 

In 2015, the White Rock branch moved into a new building next to the White Rock Youth Activity Center.

Branches
 Mesa Public Library, located in Los Alamos (2400 Central Avenue, Los Alamos, NM 87544)
 White Rock Branch Library, located in White Rock (10 Sherwood Boulevard, Los Alamos, NM 87547)

References

External links
Los Alamos County Library home page
Library HistoryThis link is for Mesa County not Los Alamos County

Library buildings completed in 1994
Public libraries in New Mexico
Los Alamos, New Mexico
Buildings and structures in Los Alamos County, New Mexico
Education in Los Alamos County, New Mexico
1943 establishments in New Mexico